Malachi Smith may refer to:

Malachi Smith (basketball) (born 1999), American basketball player
Malachi Smith (poet), Jamaican poet

See also